Krysten Michael Francis Coombs (born 15 November 1990) is an English para badminton player who competes in international level events, he also competed in para table tennis nationally before switching to badminton. He competes alongside Jack Shephard in men's doubles events.

Coombs was also an actor who made a cameo appearance in Game of Thrones in a fourth season episode.

Achievements

Paralympic Games 
Men's singles SH6

World Championships 

Men's singles

Men's doubles

European Championships 
Men's singles

Men's doubles

Doubles

Mixed doubles

International Tournaments (14 titles, 9 runners-up) 
Men's singles

Singles

Men's doubles

Doubles

References

1990 births
Living people
Sportspeople from Brighton
Paralympic badminton players of Great Britain
Badminton players at the 2020 Summer Paralympics
British para-badminton players
Paralympic bronze medalists for Great Britain
Paralympic medalists in badminton
Medalists at the 2020 Summer Paralympics

Notes